Thalita de Jong (born 6 November 1993) is a Dutch racing cyclist, who currently rides for Dutch amateur team JEGG–DJR Academy. In 2016, de Jong won the elite women's title at the Dutch National Cyclo-cross Championships, the UEC European Cyclo-cross Championships and the UCI Cyclo-cross World Championships.

Career
She competed in the 2013 UCI women's team time trial in Florence. She won gold at the 2016 UCI Cyclo-cross World Championships in Zolder, Belgium.

De Jong suffered a 2017 cyclocross season ending injury, falling at the Grand Prix Adrie van der Poel. Medical issues plagued her 2017 road season, by the end of the year, de Jong signed with the former  as it became  in 2018. She remained with the team until early in the 2022 season. Following several top-five finishes in the spring with JEGG–DJR Academy, de Jong will join  from June, a team she had previously turned professional with.

Personal life
She is the older sister of fellow professional cyclist, Demi de Jong.

Major results

Cyclo-cross

2015–2016
 1st  UCI World Championships
 1st  National Championships
 Bpost Bank Trophy
1st Sint-Niklaas
2nd Essen
 1st Bredene
 1st Ardooie
 1st Pétange
 1st Contern
 UCI World Cup
2nd Hoogerheide
2016–2017
 1st  UEC European Championships
 UCI World Cup
1st Cauberg
 Superprestige
1st Spa-Francorchamps
 Brico Cross
1st Bredene
 1st Zonnebeke
 1st Contern
 2nd Overall DVV Trophy
1st Ronse
2nd Koppenberg
3rd Hamme
3rd Essen
3rd Loenhout
3rd Baal
2017–2018
 1st Zonnebeke
 1st Leudelange
 2nd Leuven
2019–2020
 2nd Contern

Road

2011
 National Junior Road Championships
1st  Time trial
3rd Road race
 8th Overall Tour de Bretagne
2012
 1st Time trial, Zuid-West-Nederland District Road Championships
 3rd Open de Suède Vårgårda TTT
 4th Time trial, UEC European Under-23 Road Championships
2013
 2nd  Team time trial, UCI Road World Championships
 2nd Overall Tour de Bretagne
1st Young rider classification
 2nd Open de Suède Vårgårda TTT
 UEC European Under-23 Road Championships
6th Time trial
9th Road race
 10th GP Leende
2014
 2nd Open de Suède Vårgårda TTT
 3rd Overall Belgium Tour
1st  Sprints classification
1st  Young rider classification
1st Stage 2 (TTT)
 UEC European Under-23 Road Championships
4th Time trial
4th Road race
 4th Dwars door de Westhoek
 4th Ronde van Gelderland
 4th Omloop van het Hageland
 6th Overall Festival Luxembourgeois Elsy Jacobs
 10th Overall Tour of Norway
2015
 1st Erondegemse Pijl
 1st Crescent World Cup Vårgårda TTT
 2nd Grote Prijs De Wielkeszuigers
 3rd  Team time trial, UCI Road World Championships
 UEC European Under-23 Road Championships
3rd  Time trial
4th Road race
 3rd GP Gippingen
 4th Overall Holland Tour
1st  Young rider classficiation
1st Stage 6
 10th Holland Hills Classic
2016
 1st Stage 9 Giro Rosa
 2nd Overall Tour of Norway
1st  Young rider classficiation
 3rd Erondegemse Pijl
 6th Overall Giro del Trentino
1st Points classification
1st Stages 2a (TTT) & 2b
2017
 5th Dwars door Vlaanderen
2021
 1st Grote Prijs Beerens
 5th Overall Festival Elsy Jacobs
1st  Mountains classification
 7th Overall Tour International de l'Ardèche
2022
 1st Ronde de Mouscron
 3rd Volta Limburg Classic
 4th Drentse Acht van Westerveld
 5th Leiedal Koerse

See also
2012 Rabobank Women Cycling Team season
2014 Rabo–Liv Women Cycling Team season

References

External links
 
 
 Thalita de Jong at Cross Results

1993 births
Living people
Dutch female cyclists
Sportspeople from Bergen op Zoom
UCI Road World Championships cyclists for the Netherlands
Cyclists from North Brabant
UCI Cyclo-cross World Champions (women)
20th-century Dutch women
21st-century Dutch women